Fédérico Ezquerra (10 March 1909 — 30 January 1986) was a Spanish professional road bicycle racer. Born at Gordexola, he  was the brother of cyclist Arturo Ezquerra. He died at Güeñes in 1986.

Major results

1928
Colindres
Sestao
Zierbana
1929
Arrigorriaga
1930
Circuito Luarca
Vuelta a Piqueras
Zesboa
1931
Circuito Luarca
Circuito Sodupe
Legazpia
Valladolid
Vuelta a Levante
Volta a la Comunitat Valenciana
1932
Burgos
Circuito Montserty
Circuito Sodupe
Vuelta a Alava
1933
GP de la Bicicleta Eibarresa
GP de Vizcaya
GP Mondragon
 national track stayers championship
Subida a Santo Domingo
Vuelta a Galega (incl. 2 stages)
Vuelta Pontevedra (incl. 1 stage)
1934
GP de Bilbao
Torrelavega
Vuelta a la Valle de Leniz
1935
Circuito de Getxo
GP Alonsotegui
GP Aracena
GP de Bilbao
GP de Vizcaya
Trofeo Falas
1936
Beasain
Lazkao
Tour de France:
Winner stage 11
1938
Eibar - San Sebastian - Eibar (incl. stage 1)
GP Alava
GP de Bilbao
GP San Juan
Prueba Villafranca de Ordizia
1939
Cinturion de Bilbao
Vuelta a Alava
1940
Circuito de Getxo
GP Pascuas
Prueba Villafranca de Ordizia
Sondika
Vuelta a Estella
 Spanish National Road Race Championship
Circuito del Norte
Volta a la Comunitat Valenciana
1941
Vuelta a España:
Winner stage 13
1942
Ampuero
Circuito de Getxo
Circuito del Norte (incl. 2 stages)
Pamplona
Volta a Catalunya
1943
Santander

External links 

Official Tour de France results for Fédérico Ezquerra

1909 births
1986 deaths
People from Enkarterri
Spanish male cyclists
Spanish Tour de France stage winners
Sportspeople from Biscay
Cyclists from the Basque Country (autonomous community)
20th-century Spanish people